Featuring Ty Dolla Sign (stylized as Featuring Ty Dolla $ign) is the third studio album by American singer Ty Dolla Sign. It was released on October 23, 2020, by Atlantic Records. The album features guest appearances from Kid Cudi, Post Malone, Kanye West, Anderson .Paak, Quavo, Nicki Minaj, Kehlani, Big Sean, Roddy Ricch, Jhené Aiko, Future, Young Thug, FKA Twigs, and Skrillex, among others.

Background
In an interview with Spin in July 2019, Ty Dolla Sign first talked about the album, saying "I wasn't focused on, like, 'Oh, let's go make a fuckin' generic-ass hit, you know, 97 BPMs-plus, get the club going" and simultaneously stressed the importance of distinguishing himself from other artists, "I just wanted to give people some good music to listen to—something that sounds different from everybody else's shit". On December 16, 2019, it was reported that he planned to release two albums in 2020.

On July 2, 2020, Ty announced that the album's title would be Dream House, which would end his Beach House series. However, on October 8, 2020, the singer announced that the title had changed to Featuring Ty Dolla Sign, which refers to songs that he has been featured on for other artists. In a press release, he explained his choice, by saying "many people have said that when you see a song that says, 'featuring Ty Dolla $ign', you know it's gonna be fire".

On October 14, 2020, the official cover art was revealed on social media. Six days later, on October 20, the track listing was revealed.

Promotion
"Ego Death" featuring Kanye West, FKA Twigs, and Skrillex, was released as the lead single on July 1, 2020. The second single, "Expensive" featuring Nicki Minaj, was released on August 28, 2020. The third single, "Spicy" featuring Post Malone, was released on October 21, 2020. "By Yourself" featuring Jhené Aiko and Mustard, was first released as a promotional single on October 16, 2020, it was later released to urban contemporary radio on February 2, 2021, as the album's fourth single.

Critical reception

Featuring Ty Dolla Sign was met with generally favorable reviews. At Metacritic, which assigns a normalized rating out of 100 to reviews from professional publications, the album received an average score of 79, based on seven reviews. Aggregator AnyDecentMusic? gave it 7.1 out of 10, based on their assessment of the critical consensus.

In a positive review, Nicolas-Tyrell Scott of NME wrote that "There's sure to be filler across 25-tracks. However, when Ty is at his best, he soars vocally and continues to prove that he is both a hook and melody juggernaut". Robin Murray from Clash enjoyed the album, saying, "An often hit and miss experience, 'Featuring' exposes the vast creativity of feature culture, while also platforming its flaws. An unwieldy listen that still carries huge expectation, Ty Dolla $ign's latest album holds nothing back – that's its beauty, but also its deepest flaw". Dani Blum of Pitchfork stated, "Featuring cements his legacy as a singular, eminent artist – a point he has made again and again and again, but he still sounds so good proving it". Danny Schwartz of Rolling Stone wrote, "Featuring Ty$ reaffirms his gifts as a savvy songwriter who knows precisely how and when to introduce tension, dimension, and even warmth to his casual womanizing". Ben Devlin of musicOMH said, "His newest release is an hour-long suite that aims to pack in as many hooks, guests, melodies and trap beats as possible, and succeeds with flying colours".

In a mixed review, Charles Lyons-Burt of Slant Magazine said, "Featuring Ty Dolla $ign has the air of a haphazard playlist. Griffin is still a formidable center of gravity for a small army of eager collaborators, but the final product wants for some necessary fine-tuning". Steve "Flash" Juon of RapReviews said, "He's a fine producer, a middling singer, and a very forgettable lyricist. The album's title banks on his name being the sole draw, but if it has been titled "Featuring Kanye West, Quavo, Kid Cudi, Young Thug, Big Sean and Future" it would be a whole lot more accurate".

Rankings

Commercial performance
Featuring Ty Dolla Sign debuted at number four on the US Billboard 200 chart, earning 44,000 album-equivalent units (including 4,000 copies as pure album sales) in its first week. This became Ty Dolla Sign's first US top-ten debut. The album also accumulated at total of 50.83 million on-demand streams of the album's songs that week.

Track listing

Notes
  signifies a co-producer
  signifies an additional producer

Personnel
Credits adapted from Tidal.

Musicians

 Ty Dolla Sign – guitar (1, 12, 24), vocals (2–9, 11–18, 20–25)
 Gabreal "Big TC" Griffin – vocals (1, 12, 24)
 Justus West – guitar (2), vocals (4)
 Johan Lenox – strings (2, 15)
 Serpentwithfeet – vocals (4), additional vocals (25)
 BlueySport – programming (9)
 Damn James – programming (9)
 William van Zandt – programming (9)
 Burna Boy – vocals (10)
 Brandon Chapman – guitar (15)
 DJ Camper – keyboards (15)
 Angela Davis – additional vocals (25)
 Jariuce "Jehreeus" Banks – additional vocals (25)

Technical

 James Royo – mixer (2, 5–8, 11, 13–18, 20–22), recording (5–9, 13–15, 17, 21–23, 25), additional mixer (3)
 Skrillex – mixer (3, 25)
 Derek "MixedByAli" Ali – mixer (9), additional mixer (13)
 Rafael Fai Bautista – mixer (23), recording (2, 3, 5, 16, 18–20, 23, 25), additional mixer (2, 3, 16, 18), additional recording (6–9, 11, 13–15, 21, 22)
 Mike Bozzi – masterer (5, 15, 25)
 Nicolas De Porcel – masterer (9)
 William J. Sullivan – recording (3), additional mixer (3)
 Ty Dolla Sign – recording (5, 8, 14, 15)
 Nick Mac – recording (5)
 Jhair "Jha" Lazo – recording (6), additional mixer (6)
 Aubry "Big Juice" Delaine – recording (9)
 Gregg Rominiecki – recording (11), additional mixer (11)
 Eric Manco – recording (17)
 Marlon Travis Barrow – engineer (20)
 Drew Gold – additional mixer (3)
 Louis Bell – additional mixer (5)
 Jared "JT" Gagarin – additional mixer (23)
 Robert Z. Zarate – additional recording (16, 18, 19, 22)
 Todd Norman – assistant mixer (2, 5, 7, 13–15, 17, 21, 22)
 Grace Royo – assistant mixer (5, 6, 16, 19)
 Nate Graves – assistant mixer (5, 7, 14, 21, 22), assistant engineer (16, 19), assistant mix engineer (23)
 Yanis Figueroa – assistant mixer (5)
 Curtis "Sircut" Bye – assistant mixer (9, 13)
 Nightcrawler – assistant mixer (18)
 Roscoe – assistant mixer (18)
 Brian "Deep" Watters – assistant mixer (23)
 Chris Kahn – assistant mix engineer (3)
 Scott Stratton – assistant masterer (5)
 Andrew Keller – assistant recording engineer (5), assistant engineer (14), assistant mixer (15)
 Sam Agbasi – assistant recording engineer (5)
 Matthew Wilson – assistant engineer (8, 23)
 Ruben Jigga Pinto – assistant engineer (23)
 Jamal Berry – recording assistant (9)

Charts

References

2020 albums
Atlantic Records albums
Ty Dolla Sign albums